WSE may refer to:

 Warsaw School of Economics
 Warsaw Stock Exchange
 Widescreen Enhanced (16:9 aspect ratio)
 World Standard English
 World Stock Exchange
 Windows Security Essentials, a free antivirus product by Microsoft
 Web search engine
 Web Services Enhancements, an add-on to the Microsoft .NET Framework
 Wall Street English
 Whiting School of Engineering
 Work and Social Economy department of the Flemish Government